Brazil is a founding member of the United Nations and participates in all of its specialized agencies. Brazil is among the twenty top contributors to United Nations peacekeeping operations, and has participated in peacekeeping efforts in the Middle East, the former Belgian Congo, Cyprus, Mozambique, Angola, and more recently East Timor and Haiti. Brazil has been regularly elected as a non-permanent member to the Security Council since its first session in 1946 and is now among the most elected UN member states to the UNSC. Brazil was voted to become a member of the 15-country UN Security Council for a two-year term, in 2022-23.

Activities

General Assembly
Brazil has traditionally played a relevant role in the United Nations General Assembly. In 1947, Foreign Minister Osvaldo Aranha chaired the First Special Session of the General Assembly and the Second Session of the General Assembly. Since 1947, Brazil has been the first country to speak at the General Debate. Brazilian representatives deliver opening speeches that often present an assessment of the international situation as a backdrop to express the Brazilian point of view on the main issues. On September 21, 2011, President Rousseff became the first woman to open a General Debate since the United Nations was founded.

Security Council
Brazil has been elected ten times to the United Nations Security Council; the 2022-23 term wil be its 11th turn. It is currently ranked second (Japan is first) in terms of most number of years as an elected member.

List of terms as an elected member to the Security Council:

Security Council reform
Brazil is actively engaged in the reform of the United Nations Security Council and has sought to garner support for a permanent seat with veto power. It formed the G4 alliance with Germany, India, and Japan for the purpose of supporting each other’s bids for permanent seats. Their proposal calls for an enlarged Security Council, expanded in both the permanent and non-permanent categories of membership. A wide coalition of member states from all regional groups of the United Nations supported the initiative.

The United States sent strong indications to Brazil that it was willing to support its membership; albeit, without a veto. In June 2011, the Council on Foreign Relations recommended that the US government fully endorse the inclusion of Brazil as a permanent member of the Security Council. Brazil has also received backing from other permanent members: Russia, the United Kingdom, France, all nations that form Community of Portuguese Language Countries (CPLP), Chile, Indonesia, Finland, Slovenia, Australia, South Africa, Guatemala, Vietnam, the Philippines, among others.

Peacekeeping

A founding member of the United Nations, Brazil has a long tradition of contributing to peacekeeping operations. Brazil has participated in 33 United Nations peacekeeping operations and contributed with over 27,000 troops. Currently, Brazil contributes with more than 2,200 troops, military observers and police officers in three continents.

Brazil has led the military component of the United Nations Stabilisation Mission in Haiti (MINUSTAH) since its establishment in 2004. The mission's Force Commander is Major General Fernando Rodrigues Goulart of the Brazilian Army. Brazil is the biggest troop contributing country to MINUSTAH, with 2,200 active military personnel.

Brazil also leads the Maritime Task Force (MTF) of the United Nations Interim Force in Lebanon (UNIFIL). Since February 2011, the UNIFIL MTF is under the command of Rear Admiral Luiz Henrique Caroli of the Brazilian Navy. The Brazilian Niteroi-class frigate, União, is the flagship of the fleet comprising vessels from  three other countries.

Financial contribution
Brazil is one of the largest contributors to the United Nations regular budget, with a net contribution of USD 57 million for the 2022 Assessment.

Representation

New York
Brazil maintains a permanent mission to the United Nations in New York, which is headed by Ambassador Ronaldo Costa Filho. The mission is responsible for Brazil's participation in all United Nations events that concern the country in meetings of the General Assembly, Security Council, and other U.N. agencies headquartered in New York.

Geneva
Brazil maintains a permanent mission to the United Nations Office at Geneva, headed by Ambassador Maria Nazareth Farani Azevêdo. The delegation is responsible for representing Brazil at the agencies headquartered in Geneva.

Rome
In Rome, Brazil maintains a delegation to the Food and Agriculture Organization (FAO), led by Ambassador Antonino Marques Porto e Santos.

Paris
At the United Nations Educational, Scientific and Cultural Organization (UNESCO) headquarters in Paris, the Permanent Delegation of Brazil is headed by Ambassador Marcia Donner Abreu. Brazil joined UNESCO in 1946, and has been a member of its executive board several times, most recently 2007–09.

Events Hosted 
Brazil served in the past as a host for UN's conferences, such as the Conference on Environment and Development, also known as Earth Summit that happened in Rio de Janeiro in 1992. Brazil turned down offer to host 2019's UN Climate Change Conference.

See also

 Foreign relations of Brazil

References

External links

 Official website of the Permanent Mission of Brazil to the UN
 Official website of the Ministry of Foreign Relations of Brazil